Bulgaria competed at the 2019 World Athletics Championships in Doha, Qatar, 27 September–6 October 2019.

Results

Men

Field events

Women
Track and road events

Field events

References

Nations at the 2019 World Athletics Championships
World Championships in Athletics
2019